The Harvard Business School RFC is a rugby union team based at Harvard Business School in Boston, Massachusetts. The club formerly competed in the New England Rugby Football Union (NERFU) and is composed of graduate students from throughout Harvard University.

History
HBS Rugby began in the fall of 1963. Prior to the team's founding, the Harvard Business School sporting culture was dominated by softball, bowling, and ping-pong. Dissatisfied with these options, two Scottish MBA students, Jim Johnstone '65 and Morris McInnes '65, founded the HBS Rugby Club. 

Through advertisements, coercion and the promise of female spectators, the first contingent of forty or so interested men began to train at Soldiers Field. Despite the negative advice of the HBS Dean of Students and an attempt to merge the HBS side with the Harvard College side by force, Johnstone and McInnes persevered. The spring 1964 record of 5-2-1 was the harbinger of a glorious tradition of Eastern rugby strength, melding American athletes with the rugby culture of international players.

Since its inception, more than 1500 men have played for HBS Rugby.

Old Boys

An HBS Old Boys touring side formally began with a trip to the Freeport Bahamas Easter Festival in 1978. The Club was initially organized by Rowland Moriarty with Michael Rush and Eugene Skowronski assisting in the early days.  In 2007, the Old Boys traveled to the World Cup Rugby frenzy in France and completed their thirtieth annual tour with two matches in Provence. In 2008, Grand Cayman Island was the scene for rugby plays and stingrays. The Fall of 2011 found us at the World Cup in New Zealand.  Spring, 2012, we played in Bermuda.  In June, 2013, the OB's travel to France.  Other HBS ruggers have also toured the globe and play for various local sides throughout the world. October 2015 featured a tour to the UK for the Rugby World Cup, and in 2019 the HBS Olde Boys toured Japan in conjunction with the 2019 World Cup in Japan, playing two games vs Keio University and Doshisha University.

Sponsorship
HBS Rugby is supported by The Boston Consulting Group, Harpoon Brewery, Gibson Guitars, Mousse Partners, and Tommy Doyle's Irish Pub.

Notable HBS Rugby alumni
 Robin Buchanan, former dean of London Business School
 Chase Carey, CEO and Executive Chairman of Formula One
 Sir Ronald Cohen, co-founder of Apax Partners
 Ray Dalio, founder of Bridgewater Associates
 Patrick Fitzgerald, lead prosecutor in Scooter Libby, Conrad Black, and Rod Blagojevich trials
 Thomas C. Foley, former United States Ambassador to Ireland
 Rowland T. Moriary, Chairman Emiratis of CRA Charles River Associates
 Theodore Roosevelt IV, great-grandson of President Theodore Roosevelt
 Sir Wilson Whineray, former captain of the All Blacks
 Brian Burke, NHL executive, Stanley Cup champion
Sir Martin Sorrel, Chairman WPP

External links
 
Harbus coverage of HBS Rugby
USA Rugby

Rugby union teams in Boston
Harvard Business School
Rugby clubs established in 1963
1963 establishments in Massachusetts